Southampton Football Club is an English association football club based in Southampton, Hampshire. Founded in 1885 as St Mary's YMA, they became a professional club in 1891 and co-founded the Southern Football League in 1894. Southampton won the Southern League Premier Division championship six times between 1896 and 1904, and were later elected to the Football League Third Division in 1920. The Saints finished as runners-up in their first Football League season, and the following year received promotion to the Second Division as Third Division South champions. The club first entered the First Division in 1966, and currently play in its modern-day counterpart, the Premier League. Southampton won the FA Cup in 1976, reached the final of the League Cup in 1979 and 2017, and won the League Trophy in 2010.

Since the club's formation, a total of 347 players have made between 25 and 99 appearances for Southampton. Of these, 14 players have made exactly 25 appearances for the club, while only two (Bob Petrie and Cyril King) have made 99. Ted Drake, who played as a centre-forward for Southampton between 1931 and 1934, has scored the most goals of any player with between 25 and 99 appearances for the club, with 49 in all competitions; five more players have scored over 40 goals for the Saints. Six of the 338 players listed – Kevin Keegan, Derek Statham, Dean Richards, Peter Crouch, Chris Baird and Andrew Davies – have won the Southampton F.C. Player of the Season award as voted for by readers of the Southern Daily Echo, while former team captain Virgil van Dijk has won the clubs own Player of the Season award.

Key
The list is ordered first by date of debut, and then if necessary in alphabetical order by surname.
Appearances as a substitute are included. This feature of the game was introduced in the Football League at the start of the 1965–66 season.
Statistics are correct up to and including the match played on 18 March 2023. Where a player left the club permanently after this date, his statistics are updated to his date of leaving.

Players

Notes

References

External links
Southampton F.C. official website
Saints Players Archive

Southampton F.C.
Association football player non-biographical articles